Luis Eduardo García (born 4 March 1966) is a Spanish handball player. He competed in the men's tournament at the 1992 Summer Olympics.

References

1966 births
Living people
Spanish male handball players
Olympic handball players of Spain
Handball players at the 1992 Summer Olympics
Sportspeople from Seville
20th-century Spanish people